Brian E. Ballard (born November 18, 1960, in Culdesac, Idaho) is a former American sport shooter who competed in the 1988 Summer Olympics where he finished 17th in the trap event.

References

1960 births
Living people
American male sport shooters
Trap and double trap shooters
Olympic shooters of the United States
Shooters at the 1988 Summer Olympics
Pan American Games medalists in shooting
Pan American Games gold medalists for the United States
Shooters at the 1995 Pan American Games
20th-century American people
21st-century American people